John Clarke (born 24 April 2004) is an Irish footballer footballer who plays as a left-back for  club Reading.

Club career
Clarke joined Port Vale's youth-team from Stockport Town in 2021. On 22 June 2022, Reading signed Clarke to join their under-23 team. After impressing during the 2022–23 pre-season, Clarke made his debut for Reading on 6 August, coming on as a late substitute for Junior Hoilett in their 2–1 victory over Cardiff City at the Madejski Stadium.

International career
Clarke was called up to the Republic of Ireland under-19 team for the first time in August 2022 for a three day training camp. He made his debut for the U19 team on 24 September 2022, in a 2–0 win over Wales U19 in a 2023 UEFA European Under-19 Championship qualifier.

Style of play
Clarke is an attacking left-back.

Career statistics

References

2004 births
Living people
Association football fullbacks
Stockport Town F.C. players
Port Vale F.C. players
Reading F.C. players
English Football League players